Crenicichla santosi is a species of cichlid native to South America. It is found in the Amazon River basin and in the Machado River of Rondônia, Brazil.

The fish is named in honor of Ploeg’s friend Geraldo Mendes dos Santos of the Instituto Nacional de Pesquisas da Amazônia, who collected this cichlid during a survey of Rondônian rivers that took place between 1984 and 1988.

References

Ploeg, A., 1991. Revision of the South American cichlid genus Crenicichla Heckel, 1840, with description of fifteen new species and consideration on species groups, phylogeny and biogeography (Pisces, Perciformes, Cichlidae). Univ. Amsterdam, Netherlands,153 p. Ph.D. dissertation.

santosi
Freshwater fish of Brazil
Fish of the Amazon basin
Taxa named by Alex Ploeg
Fish described in 1991